The Lewiston metropolitan area may refer to:

The Lewiston, Maine metropolitan area, United States
The Lewiston, Idaho-Washington metropolitan area, United States

See also
Lewiston (disambiguation)